Alfred L. Morse Auditorium is a domed theater that is now owned by Boston University (BU) and used as an auditorium.

Built in 1906 as Temple Israel, the edifice was intended by the architect and congregation as a replica of Solomon's Temple. Boston University acquired the building in 1967 when the congregation moved. In 1971, the building was named in honor of BU benefactor Alfred L. Morse, who was a member of the BU Board of Trustees from 1968 to 1973.  The building is currently used for large lectures, events, and talks.

The building is clad in white marble and today much of it is covered in vine. It was intended by the architect and congregation to be a replica of the Temple of Solomon.

The building is adjacent to the Physics Research Building (PRB), Metcalf Science Center (SCI), and the Boston University College of Communication (COM).

References

http://www.bu.edu/bridge/archive/1999/10-15/features8.html

http://www.bu.edu/experience

Buildings at Boston University
Former synagogues in Massachusetts
Buildings and structures completed in 1906
1906 establishments in Massachusetts